Easy as Pie is an album by country singer Billy "Crash" Craddock. It was released on ABC/Dot Records in 1976.

Track listing
"Easy as Pie" (Rory Bourke, Gene Dobbins, Johnny Wilson)
"She's About a Mover"
"Think I'll Go Somewhere (And Cry Myself To Sleep)"
"You Can't Cry It Away"
"Another Woman"
"I Need Someone to Love"
"Walk Softly" (Van McCoy)
"Has A Cat Got A Tail"
"The First Time"
"You Rubbed It In All Wrong" (John Adrian)
"There Won't Be Another Now"

Billy "Crash" Craddock albums
1976 albums